is an anime adaptation of the 1865 novel Alice's Adventures in Wonderland which ran on the TV Tokyo network and other local stations across Japan from October 10, 1983 to March 26, 1984. The series was a Japanese-German co-production between Nippon Animation, TV Tokyo and Apollo Films.  The series consists of 52 episodes, however, only 26 made it to the US.

In the English language, this series is generally overshadowed by the success of Disney's 1951 feature film version of the story; however, the anime series was quite popular in various European countries, in Israel, in the Philippines, in Latin America, in Iran, and in the Arabic-speaking world. The series was also dubbed into Hindi by the national film development board of India and telecast on Doordarshan in the early 1990s.

Overview
A young girl named Alice follows a White Rabbit into a hole, only to find herself in Wonderland, where she meets many interesting characters, including the mysterious Cheshire Cat and the terrible Queen of Hearts.

The beginning of the series adheres more closely to the original novel, whereas later episodes adapt the sequel to Alice's Adventures in Wonderland,  Through the Looking-Glass, starting with episode 18.

One departure from the books is that Alice returns to the real world at the end of each episode, and goes back to Wonderland at the beginning of the next episode. These transitions between the two worlds are depicted as dream-like, and it usually takes Alice a moment to notice her surroundings have changed.

Music
The series uses two pieces of theme music for the original Japanese version. The Japanese opening song is called "Yumemiru Wonderland (夢みるワンダーランド Dreaming Wonderland)", and the Japanese ending song is called "NAZO NAZO yume no kuni (ナゾナゾ夢の国 Mysterious Dreamland)", both sung by the Japanese vocalist Tarako (also the voice actress for Alice).

Disco-style theme music used in European dubs is composed by Christian Bruhn, originally with German lyrics, "Alice im Wunderland".

Episodes

Alice in Wonderland
 Alice's Family
 Down the Rabbit Hole
 The Pool of Tears
 The Caucus Race
 The White Rabbit's House (Big Alice)
 Humpty Dumpty
 The Big Puppy
 The Forest of No Name
 The Crows
 Advice from a Caterpillar
 Looking for the Eggs
 Pig and Pepper
 Tweedledee and Tweedledum
 The Lion and the Unicorn
 The Croquet Party
 Cheshire Cat
 The Oysters
 The Lobster Quadrille
 The Mad Tea Party
 Circus Land
 The Trial
 The Weeping Mockturtle
 The Foot Tax
 Runaway Benny
 The Secret of Greenland

Through the Looking-Glass
 Alice in the Mirror
 The Queen's Picnic
 Bird's of a Feather (The Shy Duck)
 Washing Day
 Wool and Water
 Alice and the Dawson Twins
 The White Rabbit Leaves Wonderland
 The Strange Trainride
 The Corkscrew Mouse
 The Weathermakers
 The Giant Kangaroo
 The Balloon Ride
 Cloudland
 An Unpleasant Guest
 The Little Flute Player
 The Honey Elephants
 Little Bill in Love
 The Pearl of Wisdom
 The Fixit Pixie
 The Family Portrait
 The Magic Potion
 Octopus (The Vanished Light Fairy)
 All Things Nice (Many Colored Candles)
 The Non-Birthday
 Monkey Business (The Chimpanzee's Child)
 The Knight's Battle
 Queen Alice

Characters
Alice (アリス Arisu) voiced by TARAKO & Aya Beher (Tagalog GMA): In contrast to her novel counterpart, she is depicted with red hair instead of blonde, a hat, and a red and white short neck top dress similar in design to her Disney counterpart's blue and white dress. She appears younger due to her anime design (as this is the same case with Dorothy's anime depiction in the anime adaptation of the Wizard of Oz)
Benny Bunny (ベニー) voice by Masako Nozawa: Alice's rabbit companion in her adventures throughout Wonderland. Found when Alice buys a magic hat in an old shop, Benny turns out to be the nephew of the White Rabbit, so he gets along fairly well with most of the Wonderlanders. He is always uncomfortable whenever they have to go to the Jabberwocky though, as the dragon is set on making rabbit stew out of him. He is also the only character in the series not originating from Lewis Caroll's stories.
The White Rabbit: Benny's jittery uncle and one of the Queen of Hearts' associates. He has white fur as his name implies, and often worries about being late for his duties.
The Cheshire Cat (チェシャキャット Cheshire) voice by Issei Futamata: A striped cat with the power to vanish himself and others. In most versions, the Cheshire Cat is portrayed as a smart aleck. In here, he's a bit of a bumbler.
The Queen of Hearts (ハートの女王) : The usual instigator of the current adventure's problem, the Queen shares the same Rubenesque figure of her Disney counterpart. She wears a yellow dress and has a sloping, pointed nose, a contrast to her counterpart's flat face and red and black gown. Another difference that separates her from most other depictions of the character is that she is the most human out of all of them; she can be reasoned with, and while she does threaten with beheadings, she usually only sends offenders to the dungeon for a few days.
The King of Hearts: The Queen of Hearts' pushover husband and a good friend of Humpty Dumpty.
The Jabberwocky: A moody giant dragon living in a castle, beyond the forest. A loner of sorts, he doesn't like visitors that much and usually keeps to himself. Now and then he seems vaguely bent on cooking Alice's rabbit companion Benny Bunny. But he is in the end more grumpy than dangerous, and seems good-natured all in all. Sometimes ends up helping Alice with her troubles. It is possibly hinted at in "The Little Flute Player" that he may have had a lover in the past.
The Caterpillar (キャタピラ): Ostensibly the wisest out of all of the Wonderlanders, the Caterpillar can also be considered the sanest or most normal real-world-wise.  Usually found in an area filled with mushrooms, the Caterpillar smokes from his hooka while listening to the different woes of the Wonderlanders.  Alice usually comes to him for advice, which has developed into the two of them having a close friendship.
White King and White Queen: The other monarchy in Wonderland, while the White King likes to take a snooze, his wife is fixated on playing croquet.
Tweedle Dee and Tweedle Dum: Two chubby twin brothers who sometimes fight like in their nursery rhyme.
Duchess: Rarely seen without The Cook, she has a piglet as a child whom gets casually thrown about.
Walrus: A devoted friend of The Carpenter, he is rarely seen without him and was introduced at first as a villain.
Humpty Dumpty voice by Shōzō Iizuka : An irritable living egg who often seen walking on a wall and refuses to believe that he is an egg. Though he would wobble on the wall sometimes, he's often fortunate not to fall and shatter.
Mad Hatter: The hatted man who's fond of putting up tea parties.
March Hare: The Mad Hatter's closest companion at the tea party.
Dormouse: Another tea party attendee. The Dormouse is often asleep and therefore aloof. Although he receives a lot accidental abuse from other characters, he never complains. He also seemingly does not do anything besides dozing, although he is seen playing cymbals on one occasion.
Dodo: An elderly, eccentric Dodo who has shown to have dabbled in magic, he was among the characters whom Alice met while participating in the Caucus Race.
Mock Turtle: A sensitive Wonderlander that doesn't take much to get him upset. He is usually seen without the Gryphon unlike in the book.
The Lion and the Unicorn: Two animals who used to fight like in their nursery rhyme at first, but then became friends. They are rarely seen in the show. The Lion is a bit of a coward like his counterpart in The Wonderful Wizard of Oz and the Unicorn can screw his horn back on when it comes off.

Ceria voice by: Kumiko Mizukura and Aya Beher (Tagalog GMA): She is the Sister of Alice making arguing & quarrelling, she is depicted ponytail brown hair instead of blue tank top skirt with ribbon and yellow collar short sleeves dress with knee tight white bloomers, white cream stocking and black maryjane shoes. (but still unaccredited she not part of Liddell sister's).
 Mother or Lorina Hannah Liddell voice by Yoshiko Matsuo: she is Alice's mother.
 Father or Henry George Liddell voice by Akio Nojima he is Alice's father.

UK VHS releases

Alice's Adventures in Wonderland (VC1176): Released: October 1, 1990.
Episodes: Alice's Family, Down the Rabbit Hole.
Alice's Adventures in Wonderland: Vol. 2 (VC1188): Released: October 1, 1990.
Episodes: The Pool of Tears, The Caucus Race.

External links 
 
 

1983 anime television series debuts
Anime based on Alice in Wonderland
Adventure anime and manga
Fantasy anime and manga
Isekai anime and manga
Japanese fantasy television series
Nippon Animation
Television shows based on Alice in Wonderland
Television shows set in London
Television series set in the 19th century
TV Tokyo original programming